Annette Insdorf (born c. 1950) is an American film historian, author and interviewer, who currently serves as host of Reel Pieces.

Career 
Born in Paris to Polish Holocaust survivors, Insdorf and her family moved to New York when she was 3 and a half. Initially desiring to be a performer, Insdorf attended Juilliard's singing program, however upon her parents encouragement, she instead went to Queens College where she obtained her Bachelor of Arts in 1972, as well as her PhD from Yale University in 1975.

Insdorf is a frequent panelist at various film festivals worldwide, most consistently at the annual Telluride Film Festival, and often hosted annual coverage of the Cannes Film Festival alongside Roger Ebert. Insdorf has written numerous books on various cinema-related topics, including on filmmakers François Truffaut and Philip Kaufman. In 2018, she was awarded the Mel Novikoff Award at the 2018 San Francisco International Film Festival. Telluride awarded Insdorf with its Special Medal in 2021.

Insdorf made an appearance in PBS's Woody Allen: A Documentary (2011) and HBO's Spielberg (2017).

References

External links
Annette Insdorf at the Internet Movie Database

1950 births
American film historians
Juilliard School alumni
Writers from New York City
American people of Polish descent
Queens College, City University of New York alumni
Yale University alumni
Living people
Jewish American writers
Historians from New York (state)
21st-century American Jews